Collision in Black is an album by American trumpeter Blue Mitchell which features compositions and arrangements by Monk Higgins recorded in 1968 and released on the Blue Note label in 1969.

Reception

The Allmusic review awarded the album 4 stars.

Track listing
All compositions by Monk Higgins except as indicated

 "Collision in Black" - 3:02
 "Deeper in Black" (Peggy Grayson) - 3:26
 "Jo Ju Ja" (Virginia P. Bland) - 3:18
 "Blue on Black" - 2:55   
 "Swahilli Suite" - 2:58
 "Monkin' Around" - 3:38
 "Keep Your Nose Clean" (Bland) - 3:25
 "I Ain't Jivin'" (Bland) - 2:45
 "Digging in the Dirt" - 3:27
 "Who Dun It?" - 2:56
 "Kick It" (Bland) - 2:28
 "Keep Your Soul Together" - 2:48

Personnel
Blue Mitchell - trumpet
Monk Higgins - tenor saxophone, piano, organ, arrangement
Jim Horn, Ernie Watts - flute
Anthony Ortega - tenor saxophone
Dick "Slyde" Hyde, Jack Redmond - trombone 
Al Vescovo - guitar
Miles Grayson - piano, percussion
Dee Ervin - organ, percussion
Bob West - electric bass
Paul Humphrey - drums
John Cyr - percussion

References

Blue Note Records albums
Blue Mitchell albums
1969 albums
Albums arranged by Monk Higgins